The Committee of Imperial Defence was an important ad hoc part of the Government of the United Kingdom and the British Empire from just after the Second Boer War until the start of the Second World War. It was responsible for research, and some co-ordination, on issues of military strategy.

Typically, a temporary sub-committee would be set up to investigate and report at length on a specific topic. Many such sub-committees were engendered over the decades, on topics such as foreign espionage (a committee report in 1909 led to the founding of MI5 and MI6), food rationing, and aerial defence. It is possible to argue that the Committee of Imperial Defence was an important step in the development of national security coordination in the UK, and to see the current National Security Council as one of its descendants.

History
The committee was established in 1904 by Arthur Balfour, then British Prime Minister, following the recommendations of the Elgin Committee, chaired by  Lord Elgin.  It was intended as an advisory committee for the Prime Minister, one that would be small and flexible; it replaced the Cabinet's 'weak and informal' Defence Committee (set up in 1902), which had usually only met during periods of crisis.

The original concept was to create a strategic vision defining the future roles of the two military services, the Royal Navy and the British Army, after the military reductions in the wake of the Boer War. However, no arrangements were made for it to formally pass on its conclusions to those with the ability to translate them into actions. This lack soon became obvious enough that a Secretariat was appointed, under Sir George Clarke. In addition to acting as a communicator, Clarke was tasked with making sure that the policies agreed to by the committee were implemented. With the fall of the Balfour Government in 1906, and with the military services determined to control their own futures, these plans fell through, and with no support from the incoming Prime Minister, he resigned in 1907.

A small Secretariat became permanent and provided communication between members outside of Committee meetings, and with other civil servants.

Under the guidance of Maurice Hankey, the Committee slowly gained in importance. Hankey was appointed Naval Assistant Secretary to the Committee in 1908, and became Secretary to the Committee in 1912; he would hold that position for the next twenty-six years.

By 1914, the Committee had begun to act as a defence planning agency for the whole British Empire, consequently providing advice to the Dominions on occasion. It continued to perform such a role into the 1920s. It was effectively a peacetime defence planning system, one which only provided advice; formal authority remained with Ministers and service chiefs, which helped ensure the Committee's acceptability to the existing bureaucracy.

Chaired by the Prime Minister, members were usually cabinet ministers, the heads of the military services, and key civil servants; Prime Ministers from Dominion countries were de facto members of the Committee in peacetime as well.

The Committee became the Defence Committee in 1947.

See also 
Imperial War Cabinet
Joint Intelligence Committee (United Kingdom), a sub-committee of the CID
National Security Council (United Kingdom)

References

External links
 https://web.archive.org/web/20071211215252/http://www.sourceuk.net/article/0/562/sir_maurice_hankey_and_the_origins_of_the_cabinet_office.html
 How Imperial was the Committee of Imperial Defence?
 Institute for Government/King's College London - The National Security Council: national security at the centre of government

Further reading
 Johnson, Franklyn Arthur: Defence by Committee: The British Committee of Imperial Defence, 1885-1959 (Oxford University Press, London, New York, 1960)
 

1902 establishments in the United Kingdom
1939 disestablishments in the United Kingdom
Organizations established in 1902
Organizations disestablished in 1939
Second Boer War
Defunct United Kingdom intelligence agencies
Military communications of the United Kingdom